Fibrous sheath CABYR binding protein is a protein that in humans is encoded by the FSCB gene, which is found on chromosome 14.  It is found in Homo sapiens, and has the following lineage: Eukaryota; Metazoa; Chordata; Craniata; Vertebrata; Euteleostomi; Mammalia; Eutheria; Euarchontoglires; Primates; Haplorrhini; Catarrhini; Hominidae; Homo.
 The sub-cellular function of the protein is to localize to the cortex of the fibrous sheath, including the surface of the longitudinal columns and ribs of the main part of sperm flagella.

References

Further reading 

Genes
Human proteins